The Department of Urban and Regional Development was an Australian government department that existed between December 1972 and December 1975.

History
The Department was one of several new Departments established by the Whitlam Government, a wide restructuring that revealed some of the new government's program. When the Fraser Government took office in November 1975 following the 1975 Australian constitutional crisis, the Department was abolished.

Scope
Information about the department's functions and/or government funding allocation could be found in the Administrative Arrangements Orders, the annual Portfolio Budget Statements and in the Department's annual reports.

At its creation, the Department's functions were described as 'matters related to city and regional planning and development, including assistance to, and co-operation with, the States and local-governing bodies'.

Structure
The Department was a Commonwealth Public Service department, staffed by officials who were responsible to the Minister for Urban and Regional Development.

References

Australia, Urban and Regional Development
Urban and Regional Development
Urban development in Australia